Elections to Liverpool City Council were held on 1 November 1932. One third of the council seats were up for election, the term of office of each councillor being three years.

Six of the forty seats up for election were uncontested.

After the election, the composition of the council was:

Election result

Ward results

* - Councillor seeking re-election

Comparisons are made with the 1929 election results.

Abercromby

Aigburth

Allerton

Anfield

Breckfield

Brunswick

Castle Street

Childwall

Croxteth

Dingle

Edge Hill

Everton

Exchange

Fairfield

Fazakerley

Garston

Granby

Great George

Kensington

Kirkdale

Little Woolton

No election.

Low Hill

Much Woolton

Netherfield

North Scotland

Old Swan

Prince's Park

Sandhills

St. Anne's

St. Domingo

St. Peter's

Sefton Park East

Sefton Park West

South Scotland

Vauxhall

Walton

Warbreck

Wavertree

Wavertree West

West Derby

Aldermanic elections

Aldermanic Election 9 November 1932

19 Aldermen were elected by the councillors on 9 November 1932 for a term of six years.

* - re-elected alderman.

Aldermanic Election 

Alderman Joseph Dalton Flood died on 29 October 1932

Aldermanic Election 1 February 1933

Caused by the death on 22 November 1932 of Alderman Joseph Ashworth (Conservative, last elected as an alderman on 9 November 1929), Councillor George Miller Platt (Conservative, Walton elected 1 November 1932), Builder and Contractor og "The Gables", Moss Delph Lane, Aughton, was elected as an alderman by the Council on 1 February 1933

The term of office to expire on 9 November 1935.

By-elections

No. 40 Croxteth, Thursday, 3 November 1932

Caused by the disqualification of Councillor Oswald Wade (Conservative, elected to the Croxteth ward on 1 November 1930), due to him being declared bankrupt, which was reported to the Council on 5 October 1932
.

No. 25 Walton, 16 February 1933

Following the death on 22 November 1932 of Alderman Joseph Ashworth (Conservative, last elected as an alderman on 9 November 1929), Councillor George Miller Platt (Conservative, Walton elected 1 November 1932),  was elected as an alderman by the Council on 1 February 1933.

No. 7 Castle Street, 29 November 1932

Caused by Councillor Robert Garnett Sheldon (Conservative, last elected as a Councillor on 1 November 1932) being elected as an alderman by the Council on 9 November 1932.

No. 19 Kensington, 23 May 1933

Caused by the death on 25 April 1933 of Councillor Joseph Gardner (Conservative, elected 1 November 1931.

No. 8 St. Peters, 30 May 1933

Caused by the resignation of Councillor Herbert Wolfe Levy (Conservative, elected 1 November 1931) which was reported to the Council on 17 May 1933

No.10 Great George, 22 August 1933

Caused by the resignation of Councillor Harry Leo Gaffeney (Democratic Labour,  Great George elected 1 November 1931) which was reported to the Council on 26 July 1933.

See also

 Liverpool City Council
 Liverpool Town Council elections 1835 - 1879
 Liverpool City Council elections 1880–present
 Mayors and Lord Mayors of Liverpool 1207 to present
 History of local government in England

References

1932
1932 English local elections
1930s in Liverpool